Picnic is a television talk show from the Mexican TV network Telehit, hosted by Barbara Islas and Alexia Imaz.
This show features fashion tips, music, lifestyle and advise for teenagers and girls of all ages.

External links
 Official website

Mexican television talk shows